Aşağı Qəsil (also, Ashagy Kasil’) is a village in the Agdash Rayon of Azerbaijan.  The village forms part of the municipality of Qulbəndə.

References 

Populated places in Agdash District